Alfonso of Aragon may refer to:

Kings of Aragon
 Alfonso I the Battler (. 1104–1134)
 Alfonso II the Chaste or the Troubadour (r. 1164–1196)
 Alfonso III the Liberal or the Free (r. 1285–1291)
 Alfonso IV the Kind (r. 1327–1336)
 Alfonso V the Magnanimous (r. 1416–1458)

Princes (Infantes) of Aragon
 Alfonso (1332–1412), duke of Gandia, count of Denia, count of Ribagorza, marquis of Villena, constable of Castile
 Alfonso (1358–1422), duke of Gandia, count of Denia, count of Ribagorza
 Alfonso (1417–1495), duke of Villahermosa, count of Ribagorza and Cortes, baron of Arenos, grand master of the Order of Calatrava
 Alonso or Alfonso (1470–1520), archbishop of Zaragoza and Valencia and lt. general of Aragon
 Alfonso (1481–1500), duke of Bisceglie and prince of Salerno